The genus Trichopalpus are small to medium-sized predatory flies.

Species
T. obscurella (Zetterstedt, 1846)
T. fraternus (Meigen, 1826)
T. palpalis (Coquillett, 1898)
T. nigribasis Curran, 1927

References

Scathophagidae
Muscoidea genera
Taxa named by Camillo Rondani